NS-2710 (LS-193,970) is an anxiolytic drug with a novel chemical structure, developed by the small pharmaceutical company NeuroSearch. It has similar effects to benzodiazepine drugs, but is structurally distinct and so is classed as a nonbenzodiazepine anxiolytic. NS-2710 is a potent but non-selective partial agonist at GABAA receptors, although with little efficacy at the α1 subtype and more at α2 and α3. It has anxiolytic effects comparable to chlordiazepoxide, and while it is a less potent anticonvulsant than the related drug NS-2664, it has a much longer duration of action, and similarly to other α2/α3-preferring partial agonists produces little sedative effects or physical dependence.

References 

Anxiolytics
Ketoximes
Benzimidazoles
3-Pyridyl compounds
GABAA receptor positive allosteric modulators